Beason is a surname. Notable people with the surname include:

Bill Beason (1908–1988), American swing jazz drummer
Doug Beason, American science fiction author
Jon Beason (born 1985), American football linebacker
Scott Beason (born 1969), American talk radio host and politician
Tanner Beason (born 1997), American soccer player